Aeolochroma venia is a moth of the family Geometridae first described by Louis Beethoven Prout in 1924. It is found on New Guinea.

References

Moths described in 1924
Pseudoterpnini
Moths of New Guinea